Jean-Luc Dogon (born 13 October 1967) is a French football coach and a former player. He manages the Under-19 squad of Bordeaux. While at Bordeaux he won the 1995 UEFA Intertoto Cup and played in the 1996 UEFA Cup Final. While at Strasbourg he won the Coupe de la Ligue in 1997, playing in the final.

References

External links
Profile at French Football Federation
Profile at racingstub.com

1967 births
Living people
Sportspeople from Manche
French footballers
Association football defenders
France international footballers
France under-21 international footballers
Stade Lavallois players
Racing Club de France Football players
FC Girondins de Bordeaux players
RC Strasbourg Alsace players
Stade Rennais F.C. players
US Créteil-Lusitanos players
Ligue 1 players
Ligue 2 players
French football managers
Footballers from Normandy